François Nicole (23 December 1683 – 18 January 1758) was a French mathematician, born in Paris and died there, who published his Traité du calcul des différences finies in 1717; it contains rules both for forming differences and for effecting the summation of given series. Besides this, in 1706 he wrote a work on roulettes, especially spherical epicycloids; and in 1729 and 1731 he published memoirs on Newton's essay on curves of the third degree.

References

1683 births
1758 deaths
18th-century French mathematicians
Members of the French Academy of Sciences